Tahirou Congacou (1911 – 15 June 1993) was a Beninese politician, most active during the 1960s, when his country was known as Dahomey. He served as President of the National Assembly from 1964 to 1965, and in that capacity served as acting President of Benin from 29 November 1965 to 22 December 1965. He also served as acting foreign minister during 1965.

Early political career
Congacou was born to a Dendi family in 1913 and was a descendant of the Djougou royal house. His ancestors were oral tradition keepers in the kingdom of Djougou. In colonial Dahomey, Congacou served as a subprefect in Nikki. In the aftermath of World War II, he was a deputy to the General Council of Dahomey. He also served in the Dahomey territorial assembly from 1952 to 1957. When Hubert Maga was deposed in 1963, Congacou was elected head of the National Assembly, as well as assistant secretary general of the Parti Democratique Dahomeen (PDD), the new national party. He served as President of the National Assembly of Dahomey from January 1964 to November 1965.

President of Dahomey
On November 29, 1965, General Christophe Soglo forcibly removed Justin Ahomadégbé-Tomêtin's mandate. He temporarily handed power to Congacou, under the provisions of Articles 17 and 35 of the Dahomeyan constitution. Congacou was charged to form a national coalition to end the regionalism that dominated Dahomeyan politics at the time.

Congacou's government was composed of himself and four technocrats. It disbanded the PDD on December 4 and set free political prisoners. In accordance with Article 7 of the constitution, the regime was forced to hold elections by January 18, 1966.

When the new president failed to do so, Soglo removed Congacou from power on December 22, 1965.

Later life
During the presidency of Emile Derlin Zinsou, Congacou was president of the Social and Economic Council, established in October 1968. Congacou died on 15 June 1993.

References

Bibliography
 .
 .
 .

1911 births
1993 deaths
People of French West Africa
Beninese Muslims
Presidents of the National Assembly (Benin)
Foreign ministers of Benin
Dendi people
People from Djougou
20th-century Beninese politicians